Spaghetti Bolognaise and More Songs for Little Kids, also known as Spaghetti Bolognaise, is the third studio album by Australian children's musician Peter Combe. It was released in June 1985 and was certified platinum in Australia in May 1993.

Track listing
Side A
 "Spaghetti Bolognaise"	
 "Jellybean Road"	
 "Mr. Clicketty Cane"	
 "When You're Feeling Crook"	
 "Rain"	
 "1 2 3 4 5"	
 "Parcel in the Post"	
 "Yes Please"	
 "I Just Love Bananas"	
 "Down in the Bathroom"
 "In the Summertime"

Side B	
 "Phone Calls Daddy"	
 "Nutrition Blues"	
 "Mary"
 "Tom"	
 "Thingth I Thay"	
 "Exterminate"	
 "Little Doggy"
 "The Three Little Pigs"	
 "Sometimes I Feel"	
 "All My Silkworms"	
 "It's So Hot Today"	
 "O Little One"

All songs composed, arranged and produced by Peter Combe.

Certifications

Release history

References

1985 albums
Peter Combe albums